A Bunch of Stiff Records, also known as A Bunch of Stiffs, is a various artists album to promote some of the first acts to be signed by Stiff Records. It is subtitled Undertakers to the Industry – If They're Dead - We'll Sign 'Em.
 
One of the tracks, Elvis Costello's "Less Than Zero", had been issued as single only a week prior to this album being released, although this is an unusual and otherwise-unavailable mix of the song, which has keyboards overdubbed over the intro.  Motörhead's "White Line Fever" had been scheduled for release in December 1976, but the issue was cancelled. Wreckless Eric's "(I'd Go The) Whole Wide World" was issued as a single in August 1977.

The album did not enter the UK charts.

Graham Parker's track (No. 6, the final track on side 1 of the LP) was not listed on the original release, probably due to his contract with Phonogram, for whose Vertigo label he and the Rumour had already released two LPs.

The album was designed by Barney Bubbles (uncredited, as was his usual practice).

Track listing

See also
Stiff Records discography

References

1977 compilation albums
New wave compilation albums
Record label compilation albums
Stiff Records compilation albums